The Craft is a 1996 American teen supernatural horror film directed by Andrew Fleming from a screenplay by Peter Filardi and Fleming and a story by Filardi. The film stars Robin Tunney, Fairuza Balk, Neve Campbell, and Rachel True. It follows four outcast teenage girls at a Los Angeles parochial high school who pursue witchcraft for their own gain and subsequently experience negative repercussions.

The Craft was theatrically released in the United States on May 3, 1996, by Columbia Pictures. It was a surprise hit, earning $6.7 million in its opening weekend and $55.6 million worldwide, against a budget of $15 million. The film received mixed reviews from critics, who praised the performances of its leads, direction and production values, but criticized its writing, inconsistent tone and political messages.

In the years since its release, the film has gained a cult following. The film was nominated for a Saturn Award for Best Horror Film and Fairuza Balk for Best Supporting Actress. Balk and Tunney also won the MTV Movie Award for Best Fight. A sequel, The Craft: Legacy, was released on October 28, 2020.

Plot
Sarah Bailey, a beautiful but troubled teenage girl with unusual abilities, has just moved from San Francisco to Los Angeles with her father and stepmother. At her new school, she forms a friendship with a group of girls who are outcasts for various reasons and are rumored to be witches. Bonnie Harper bears burn scars from an auto accident, Nancy Downs lives in a trailer with her mother and abusive stepfather, and Rochelle Zimmerman is a black student who is subjected to racist bullying by a group of popular white girls. The girls worship a powerful earth deity they call "Manon".

Sarah becomes attracted to the popular Chris Hooker. When Bonnie observes Sarah levitating a pencil in class, she and the other outcast girls are convinced that she can complete their coven as "the fourth", completing an air-water-earth-fire circle and making them all powerful. When Sarah is harassed by a vagrant with a snake (whom she had encountered before in her new house), he is immediately hit by a car. The girls believe their combined will caused it to happen, which strengthens their bond. It is also revealed that Sarah once attempted suicide.

After a date with Chris, Sarah is upset that he spread a false rumor that they had sex and she was terrible in bed. When Sarah confronts him, he treats her disrespectfully in front of his friends. Sarah casts a love spell on him. Rochelle then casts a revenge spell on racist bully Laura Lizzie. Bonnie casts a spell for beauty, and Nancy a spell for power. The spells are successful: Chris becomes infatuated with Sarah, Bonnie's scars on her back miraculously heal. Rochelle's bully, Laura, begins losing her hair. Nancy causes her stepfather to have a fatal heart attack, probably using pleurisy root as foreshadowed by open book in previous scene, enabling her and her mother to cash in on his life insurance policy and move into a luxurious high-rise apartment.

Nancy becomes power hungry and encourages the others to join her in a rite called "Invocation of the Spirit," despite being warned against the spell by Lirio, the owner of a local occult shop and practicing witch. Upon completion of the spell, Nancy is struck by lightning. The following morning, the other girls see Nancy walking on water, with beached sharks and other dead animals littering the shore. In the days that follow, Nancy becomes increasingly devoid of empathy and engages in risky behavior that endangers her life and those of others.

The spells the girls cast eventually lead to negative consequences, as Bonnie becomes aggressively narcissistic, Rochelle finds Laura traumatized by her baldness and sobbing hysterically, and the obsessed Chris attempts to rape Sarah after she rejects his continual advances. In supposed retaliation, Nancy uses a glamour spell to make herself look like Sarah and attempts to fool Chris into having sex with her at a party. She is interrupted by the real Sarah, who tells Nancy to leave with her, but it becomes obvious that Nancy's desire to control Chris is mixed with unrequited feelings. Upset at being fooled, Chris says Nancy must be jealous, angering her, and she uses her power to kill Chris by throwing him out of a window.

Sarah attempts a binding spell to prevent Nancy from doing more harm, but it does not work and the coven turns on Sarah. Sarah seeks out Lirio, but changes her mind and leaves before Lirio can offer help. They invade her dreams, torment her with visions of swarms of scorpions, snakes, rats, and insects, and make her believe that her family has died in a plane crash. The rest of the coven then try to induce Sarah to commit suicide, and Nancy cuts Sarah's wrists herself. Although initially terrified, Sarah successfully invokes the spirit and is able to heal herself and fight back. She scares off Bonnie and Rochelle by showing them glamours in a mirror of Bonnie with her face scarred and Rochelle losing her hair like Laura. Sarah then defeats Nancy and binds her, preventing her from causing harm forever.

Bonnie and Rochelle, finding their powers gone, visit Sarah to attempt reconciliation, only to find that she wants nothing to do with them and that Manon took their powers because they abused them. They scornfully mutter that Sarah must have lost her powers too but Sarah then makes a tree branch nearly fall on them. She warns them to be careful not to end up like Nancy, who has been committed to a psychiatric hospital, delusional and her powers bound, and strapped to her bed as she desperately insists she can fly.

Cast

Production
The concept for The Craft came from a collaboration between producer Douglas Wick, who wanted to create a film about the high school experience blended with witchcraft, and screenwriter Peter Filardi, who extensively researched the topic and wrote the initial draft. Andrew Fleming was hired to direct and produce the final version of the screenplay.

Eighty-five other actresses screen-tested for the four main roles, including Angelina Jolie, Scarlett Johansson and Alicia Silverstone. Rachel True and Fairuza Balk were the first to be cast in their respective roles. The character of Rochelle was re-written to be black when True was cast, incorporating racism subplot as the character's major conflict. Robin Tunney was initially cast in the role of Bonnie, but the producers decided she would be better in the starring role of Sarah, which she was persuaded to accept despite preferring the former. Neve Campbell, the most well known of the four actresses for her role on Party of Five, was then cast as Bonnie. Tunney had shaved her head for her role in Empire Records and had to wear a wig throughout filming.

Production enlisted a real-life Wiccan named Pat Devin to act as an on-set advisor for the film. She wrote the incantations used and ensured that the treatment of the Wiccan subject-matter was as accurate and respectful as possible.

The shooting took place throughout Los Angeles, including the Los Angeles International Airport, Sunset Boulevard, and Broadway. Verdugo Hills High School was the setting for the fictional Catholic school, St. Benedict's Academy; production designer Marek Dobrowolski added different religious statues throughout the building and the grounds. Sarah's home in the film was a two-story Spanish mansion and the interiors were built on a soundstage at Culver City Studios. The occult bookstore was shot at the El Adobe Marketplace in Hollywood Boulevard. The room was repainted and enhanced and occult icons such as candles, stigmas, religious statues, masks, and tribal dolls were added for effect. Jensen's Recreation Center in Echo Park was chosen to avoid overuse of frequently seen Los Angeles locations. During filming, an unrelated accident occurred in which a child was injured; the production's medic saw this and called paramedics. The makeshift altar was set in Wood Ranch, a location that Dobrowolski called the hardest to find. Dobrowolski wanted to avoid manicured parks like Griffith Park. The beach summoning took place at Leo Carrillo State Park, which was chosen because its crest made it seem less visually boring.

The makeup effects were designed and created by Tony Gardner and his special effects company Alterian, Inc., which also created the beached sharks for the film.

Soundtrack

The Craft: Music from the Motion Picture was released on April 30, 1996, by Columbia Records on CD and cassette, one month before the film's official theatrical release in the United States. The soundtrack contains a collection of songs, to suit the theme of the movie, from various artists including Heather Nova, Letters to Cleo, and Spacehog. Nova's version of "I Have the Touch", originally performed by Peter Gabriel, which featured during the end credits of the film, was exclusively included on the soundtrack, and is not available as a single, or on any of Nova's albums, nor does she perform the song in concert. The tracks in film, titled "Sick Child", "Fallin'" and "Scorn", performed by Siouxsie and the Banshees, Connie Francis and Portishead, respectively, were omitted from the soundtrack due to copyright issues from their record labels. However, they were only included in the film as part of an arrangement with PolyGram Film & Television Licensing. An uncredited bonus track, "Bells, Books, and Candles", composed by Graeme Revell for the film's score, was included on the soundtrack. A follow-up soundtrack, The Original Motion Picture Score, was released on June 18, 1996 from Varèse Sarabande, and contained the film's score which was entirely composed and produced by Graeme Revell.

Track listing

Release
The Craft was theatrically released in the United States on May 3, 1996, by Columbia Pictures.

Home Media
The film was released on VHS and DVD on July 22, 1997 and rereleased on a special edition DVD on September 12, 2000. The film debuted on the Blu-ray format for the first time on October 13, 2009.

The film was given a special collector's edition on March 12, 2019 by Shout Factory. Though the new collection of special features was praised, the disc received negative reviews for not remastering the image and simply porting over the old scan from the 2009 disc.

The film was re-released by Shout Factory on 4K UHD on May 17, 2022 for the film's 25th Anniversary. The film was given a fresh new 4K scan from the original camera negative.

Reception

Box office
The film opened at number one at the North American box office, making US$6,710,995. The movie was a sleeper hit, which Columbia attributed to teenagers and young women, who responded to its themes. According to Box Office Mojo, The Craft is the 11th-highest-grossing film since 1980 dealing with the genre of witches.

Critical reception
On Rotten Tomatoes the film has a 57% approval rating based on 60 reviews, with an average rating of 5.5/10. The site's consensus reads: "The Crafts campy magic often overrides the feminist message at the film's core, but its appealing cast and postmodern perspective still cast a sporadic spell".

Emanuel Levy of Variety described it as "a neatly crafted film that begins most promisingly as a black comedy a la Heathers, but gradually succumbs to its tricky machinery of special effects". Roger Ebert also felt the film was mired in excessive special effects, but praised the performances of the four leads, as did Mick LaSalle of the San Francisco Chronicle. Stephen Holden of The New York Times echoed other reviews, praising the first half of the film as a "celebration of adolescent nonconformity and female independence", but criticized the last half as a "heavy-handed sermon about karma" with "garish" special effects. Rita Kempley of The Washington Post called it "a brew of Hawthorne, Heathers and Hollywood hocus-pocus" that was nonetheless a "bubbling mess of a movie" that "leaves us more bothered than bewitched".

The film was nominated for a Saturn Award for Best Horror Film and Fairuza Balk for Best Supporting Actress. Balk and Tunney also won the MTV Movie Award for Best Fight.

Legacy
The film is often labeled a "cult classic" and has acquired a loyal fan base and social media presence. The Huffington Post, writing in 2016, praised The Craft for departing from clichés of the teen movie genre and incorporating darker themes, saying it became "part of the '90s teen canon and a cult classic of its own merit." Complex magazine praised the relevance of the film 20 years later, saying it "feels much more progressive than many of the movies that come out today" and calling the viewing of the film "a rite of passage" for young women. Angelica Jade Bastién of Vulture wrote, "The Craft earned a generation of devoted fans because of how it charts the friendship between these four girls — its tentative beginnings, the joys of its strength, and its ultimate downfall," and singled out "Fairuza Balk’s fierce performance... [as] perhaps The Crafts greatest legacy... She's a beguiling and fearsome portrait of female anger."

In 2013, three of the main actresses, with the exception of Fairuza Balk, reunited for a special Halloween screening of the film at the Hollywood Forever Cemetery.

The Craft served as an inspiration for the 2013 song "Dark Horse" by Katy Perry.

Sequel

A straight-to-DVD sequel was in the works, but it was terminated. In May 2016, Sony Pictures announced that a sequel of The Craft was currently in development and it would be written and directed by Leigh Janiak. The announcement of the sequel spawned negative reactions from fans of the original film.

In March 2019, it was announced that the development of the sequel had been taken over by Jason Blum and his Blumhouse Productions company, and it was also announced that the film would be distributed by Columbia Pictures. Zoe Lister-Jones signed on to write the script and direct the film with filming scheduled to begin in July 2019. Daniel Casey later joined the production as screenwriter. In June 2019, Cailee Spaeny was cast as one of the leads. In September 2019, Gideon Adlon, Lovie Simone and Zoey Luna were cast for the remaining three lead roles. In October 2019, David Duchovny joined the cast in an undisclosed role. Later, Michelle Monaghan joined the film in an undisclosed role. Two more casting announcements were made in October 2019, also in undisclosed roles, Nicholas Galitzine and Julian Grey. Filming began on October 22, 2019.

In late September 2020, Sony released an official trailer and announced that instead of a theatrical release, the film would be released on demand everywhere on October 28, 2020.

References

External links

 
 
 
  

1996 films
1996 horror films
1990s fantasy drama films
1990s high school films
1990s supernatural horror films
1990s teen drama films
1990s teen fantasy films
1990s teen horror films
American dark fantasy films
American fantasy drama films
American high school films
American horror drama films
American supernatural horror films
American teen drama films
American teen horror films
Burn survivors in fiction
Columbia Pictures films
Films about Wicca
Films about witchcraft
Films directed by Andrew Fleming
Films produced by Douglas Wick
Films scored by Graeme Revell
Films set in Los Angeles
Films shot in California
Films shot in Los Angeles
Supernatural drama films
1990s feminist films
1990s female buddy films
1990s English-language films
1990s American films